N-Phenethylnordesomorphine is an opiate analgesic drug derived from desomorphine by replacing the N-methyl group with β-phenethyl. Since desomorphine is already around eight times more potent than morphine, the additional boost in binding affinity produced by using the larger phenethyl group makes N-phenethylnordesomorphine a highly potent analgesic drug, some 85x more potent than morphine, and a similar strength to the closely related morphinan derivative phenomorphan.

See also
 14-Cinnamoyloxycodeinone
 14-Phenylpropoxymetopon
 7-PET
 N-Phenethyl-14-ethoxymetopon
 N-Phenethylnormorphine
 RAM-378
 Ro4-1539

References

4,5-Epoxymorphinans
Semisynthetic opioids
Mu-opioid receptor agonists